Pareronia is a genus of butterflies of the subfamily Pierinae within the family Pieridae. The species are found in Southeast Asia and are mimics of the Danainae genus Parantica.

Species
Pareronia argolis (Felder, C & R Felder, 1860)
Pareronia avatar (Moore, [1858]) – pale wanderer
Pareronia aviena Fruhstorfer, 1910
Pareronia boebera (Eschscholtz, 1821)
Pareronia ceylanica (Felder, C & R Felder, 1865) – dark wanderer
Pareronia chinki Joicey & Noakes, 1915
Pareronia gullussa (Fruhstorfer, 1910)
Pareronia hippia (Fabricius, 1787) – Indian wanderer
Pareronia jobaea (Boisduval, 1832) (or Pareronia iobaea)
Pareronia kyokoae Nishimura, 1996
Pareronia nishiyamai Yata, 1981
Pareronia paravatar Bingham, 1907
Pareronia phocaea (Felder, C & R Felder, 1861)
Pareronia tritaea (Felder, C & R Felder, 1859)
Pareronia valeria (Cramer, 1776) – common wanderer or Malayan wanderer

References

External links
images representing Pareronia  at Consortium for the Barcode of Life

 
Pieridae genera
Taxa named by Charles Thomas Bingham